Sylvia Anjel Santana (born November 23, 1979) is an American politician and a Democratic member of the Michigan Senate, representing the 2nd district. She previously represented the 3rd district from 2019 to 2022. She also served in the Michigan House of Representatives from the 9th district from 2017 to 2019.

References

External links
 Official Senate Profile
 Campaign website

1979 births
Living people
Democratic Party members of the Michigan House of Representatives
Democratic Party Michigan state senators
Politicians from Cincinnati
African-American women in politics
African-American state legislators in Michigan
Women state legislators in Michigan
20th-century African-American women
20th-century African-American people
21st-century American women politicians
21st-century American politicians
21st-century African-American women
21st-century African-American politicians